Paradinonemertes is a genus of worms belonging to the family Dinonemertidae.

The species of this genus are found in Central America.

Species:

Paradinonemertes drygalskii 
Paradinonemertes macrostomum

References

Nemerteans